Mikel Ruffinelli (born 1972) is an American woman who currently holds the record of widest hip in the world, according to the World Record Academy.

Early life, marriage and pregnancy

Mikel was a normal-sized young woman and in her early 20s weighed an above average . But at 22, she put on  after having first child Andrew. After daughters Destynee, Autumn, and Justyce followed, her weight and hips ballooned further.

She eats an average 5,000 calories a day.

It is possible that this extraordinary accumulation of fat tissue is an advanced stage of a medical condition called lipedema.

She was born on January 31, 1973

See also
 Obesity

References

Living people
1972 births
Obesity in the United States
People from Los Angeles